Hoctor is a surname that may refer to several people:
Barbara Hoctor, a host of Morning Edition from 1979 to 1980
Harriet Hoctor, dancer for whom Hoctor's Ballet was written
Máire Hoctor, politician